Diagnostic medical sonography (DMS), a branch of diagnostic medical imaging, is the use of imaging by medical ultrasound for medical diagnosis. DMS uses non-ionizing ultrasound to produce 2D and 3D images of the body.  In Canada, the credentialing for diagnostic medical sonography is the Canadian Association of Registered Ultrasound Professionals.  In the United States, the credentialing body is the American Registry for Diagnostic Medical Sonography.

Diagnostic Medical Sonography Degree Prerequisites:

When enrolled in a degree seeking program, most colleges or universities will have a core curriculum that is required before starting ultrasound courses. The core studies are designed to prepare students for the specialized and more technical nature of the degree major. The courses will include some fundamental medical training as well as the required general studies material.

Meeting the requirements necessary for entrance into ultrasound technician school can take approximately a year. The typical requirements will include courses such as algebra, physics, anatomy, communications and computers. In addition to the course requirements, it is often mandatory that a good standing GPA be maintained prior to entry into the program. These requirements are standard for most schools, however some may advise that additional requirements be met before accepting students.

Prospective ultrasound students are advised to contact ultrasound training schools in their areas to determine available training programs, degree options and the admissions requirements.

Diagnostic Medical Sonography Job Outlook & Salary:

According to the Bureau of Labor Statistics (BLS), overall employment of diagnostic medical sonographers is expected to increase by 17% between the years of 2016 and 2026. The median annual wage for diagnostic medical sonographers was $69,650 in May 2016.

References

External links 
 Medical Sonographer - Details on medical sonographer (ultrasound technician) Career.
Canadian Association of Registered Ultrasound Professionals
American Registry for Diagnostic Medical Sonography.

Medical imaging
Medical ultrasonography